PBJ was an American digital broadcast children's television network that was originally a joint venture between Luken Communications and DreamWorks Classics. PBJ is now owned by NBCUniversal. PBJ began programming in late summer 2011, and had 19 broadcast affiliates before they ceased operations in March 2016 due to NBCUniversal's acquisition.

Programming
PBJ aired programs from the DreamWorks Classics library including The Archie Show, Mr. Magoo, Sabrina the Teenage Witch, The Lone Ranger, Gumby, The Harveytoons Show, The Secrets of Isis, The New Adventures of Zorro, Shazam!, and Lassie.

PBJ also aired automotive programming from Tuff TV in non-prime midday and late night timeslots, along with paid programming.

Final programming
These were the shows aired on PBJ at the time the channel closed down.

 3-2-1 Penguins!
 The Archie Show
 The Barkleys
 BraveStarr
 The Charlie Horse Music Pizza
 Ethelbert the Tiger
 Fabulous Funnies
 Filmation's Ghostbusters
 Gagsters
 Get Reel Music Mix
 Godzilla
 Good Dog!
 Groovie Goolies
 Grassroots Racing TV
 Guess with Jess
 The Harveytoons Show
 He-Man and the Masters of the Universe
 Hero High
 The Houndcats
 Kid Fitness
 Kid Power
 Lamb Chop's Play-Along
 Lassie
 Mr. Magoo
 My Life Me
 My Parents Are Aliens
 Pet Friends
 Postman Pat
 Ride Guide
 Sabrina the Teenage Witch
 The Secrets of Isis
 Sergeant Preston of the Yukon
 She-Ra: Princess of Power
 Skippy the Bush Kangaroo
 Space Academy
 Theodore Tugboat
  Tiny Toon Adventures
 The Tomfoolery Show
 VeggieTales

E/I
 9th Period
 Biz Kid$
 Distant Roads
 Eco Company
 Mustard Pancakes
 Real Life 101

Former programming
 The Adventures of Black Beauty (Fall 2011)
 Aqua Kids Adventures
 Ariel, Zoey and Eli Too
 Beta Records
 Dog & Cat Training
 Drop In
 Fat Albert and the Cosby Kids (2011-2015)
 The Lone Ranger (2011-Summer 2012)
 Mountain Bike Show
 Passport to Explore
 Rocket Robin Hood (Winter-Spring 2012)

References

External links
 Luken Communications website
 DreamWorks Classics website
 RabbitEars Website

Television channels and stations established in 2011
Television channels and stations disestablished in 2016
Joint ventures
Defunct television networks in the United States
DreamWorks Classics